Demetrius Futaki (Hungarian: Futaki  Demeter) (d. 1372) was the Bishop of Várad (Oradea) between 1345 and 1372.

Life 
He was born in the village Mézes in Zemplén county in the early 14th century. In 1324 he was canon of Buda. In 1331 he was subcollector and canon of Várad. In these decades he was the rector of the seminary of Várad and the Queen's chaplain. On 15 July 1345 he became the bishop of Várad.

Role in politics 
Demetrius was ambassador several times to Moldavia, Italy and Avignon.

References

External links 
 Pallas Nagy Lexikona
 I. Futaky Demeter In: Karácsonyi, János: "Két váradi püspök vezetékneve". Turul, 1903 (03).
 SCHEMATISMUS HISTORICUS DIOECESIS MAGNOVARADINENSIS LATINORUM 

1372 deaths
14th-century Hungarian people
14th-century Roman Catholic bishops in Hungary
Hungarian nobility
Year of birth unknown
Bishops of Várad